Per Magnar Arnstad (6 December 1937 – 7 March 2022) was a Norwegian entrepreneur and politician.

Life and career
Arnstad studied at the University of Oslo before directing multiple companies from 1969 and 1997. From 1969 to 1971, he directed Norsk Brædselolje, NHO Transport from 1988 to 1992, and Oslo og Follo busstrafikk from 1993 to 1997.

While at the University of Oslo, Arnstad was a member of the Centre Party student group. He then served as secretary of the party's political group in the Storting from 1965 to 1969 and was later the party's general secretary from 1969 to 1972. In Korvald's Cabinet, he served as State Secretary under Minister of Transport and Communications John Austrheim from 30 October 1972 to 16 October 1973.

Arnstad died in Oslo on 7 March 2022, at the age of 84.

References

1937 births
2022 deaths
Norwegian politicians
Norwegian state secretaries
Centre Party (Norway) politicians
University of Oslo alumni
People from Stjørdal